The Adria–Wien Pipeline (AWP) is a crude oil pipeline, which connects the Transalpine Pipeline from Würmlach at the Italian-Austrian border with the Schwechat Refinery near Vienna, Austria. It allows oil supplies to Austria from the Italian oil terminal in Trieste.

History
The planning of the pipeline started in 1965 with establishment of Adria–Wien Pipeline GmbH. The construction started in 1969 and the pipeline was commissioned in 1970.

Technical features
The capacity of the pipeline is 8 million tons of crude oil per year.

Operating company
The pipeline is operated by Adria–Wien Pipeline GmbH, in which OMV owns 76%. Other shareholders are BP Austria, Shell Austria, Esso Austria and Agip.

References

External links

Adria-Wien Pipeline GmbH website

Energy infrastructure completed in 1970
Oil pipelines in Austria